Emerson may refer to:

People
 Emerson (surname), a surname (and list of people with that name)
 Emerson (given name), a given name (and list of people with that name)

Places

Australia
Emerson Crossing, a place in Adelaide

Canada
 Emerson, Manitoba
Pembina–Emerson Border Crossing
 Emerson (electoral district), a former electoral division in Manitoba
 Emerson, Weldford Parish, New Brunswick

United Kingdom 

 Emerson's Green or Emersons Green, South Gloucestershire, England

United States
 Emerson (Gary), a neighborhood in north-central Gary, Indiana
 Emerson, Arkansas
 Emerson, Georgia
 Emerson, Iowa
 Emerson, Nebraska
 Emerson, New Jersey
 Emerson, Ohio
 Emerson, West Virginia
 Emerson Hill, Staten Island, a neighborhood of New York City
 Emerson Township, Michigan
 Emerson Township, Dixon County, Nebraska
 Emerson Township, Harlan County, Nebraska

Institutions
 Emerson College, Boston, Massachusetts
 Emerson Hospital, Concord, Massachusetts
 Emerson Preparatory School, Washington, D.C.

Companies
 Emerson Electric, American major multinational corporation
 Emerson Flutes
 Emerson Group, British property company
 Emerson Knives
 Emerson Radio
 Emerson Records

Other uses
Emerson Literary Society, a coed collegiate literary society
Emerson String Quartet, a chamber music group
Emerson, Lake & Palmer, a progressive rock group
Emerson Drive, a Canadian country music group
Emerson (typeface)

See also
Emery (name)
Emmerson (disambiguation)